Anahi Tosi (born ) is an Argentine female volleyball player. She is part of the Argentina women's national volleyball team.

She participated in the 2015 FIVB Volleyball Girls' U18 World Championship, 2017 FIVB Volleyball Women's U20 World Championship, 2018 FIVB Volleyball Women's World Championship, and 2018 FIVB Volleyball Women's Nations League
 
At club level she played for Boca Juniors in 2018.

References

External links 
Anahi Tosi: Argentina saldrá con todo contra Perú, vivevoley.com, July 5, 2014

1998 births
Living people
Argentine men's volleyball players
Argentine women's volleyball players
Place of birth missing (living people)
Opposite hitters